Rocky River is a city in western Cuyahoga County, Ohio, United States. The city is named for the Rocky River that forms its eastern border. The population was 21,755 according to the 2020 census data results.

Early history
In the summer of 1764, British Colonel John Bradstreet led a force of more than 2,000 regular soldiers, American volunteers and native Americans as part of an attack to stop Pontiac’s Rebellion, which ended before Bradstreet could attack. His mission was revised to retrieval of prisoners, exploration and peacemaking. As the host of 60 boats and nine canoes attempted to find shelter in an increasing storm on Lake Erie, waves overcame the fleet, ruining 25 boats and damaging many others. Bradstreet and his men came ashore in what is now Bradstreet’s Landing Park in Rocky River on 18 October 1764. After tarrying three days, the diminished force returned to Ft. Niagara enduring significant hardship on their voyage. Rumors to the contrary, only one life was lost in the endeavor.

Geography

Most of Rocky River's eastern border follows the river bearing its name, which runs through the Rocky River Reservation of the Cleveland Metroparks system, adjacent to the city's eastern neighbor, Lakewood. A small strip of Cleveland itself also borders Rocky River; however, the two cities are not directly connected via road. Lake Erie lines the entire northern border of the city while the city of Fairview Park marks the southern border. On Rocky River's western border are the cities of Bay Village to the northwest and Westlake to the southwest.

Demographics

2010 census
As of the 2010 United States Census, there were 20,213 people, 9,283 households, and 5,242 families residing in the city. The racial makeup of the city was 95.5% White, 1.0% African American, 0.1% Native American, 1.8% Asian, 0.4% from other races, and 1.3% from two or more races. Hispanic or Latino of any race were 1.8% of the population.

There were 9,283 households, of which 25.1% had children under the age of 18 living with them, 45.9% were married couples living together, 7.7% had a female householder with no husband present, 2.8% had a male householder with no wife present, and 43.5% were non-families. 39.5% of all households were made up of individuals, and 19.3% had someone living alone who was 65 years of age or older. The average household size was 2.16 and the average family size was 2.95.

The median age in the city was 45.6 years. 21.8% of residents were under the age of 18; 4.8% were between the ages of 18 and 24; 22.5% were from 25 to 44; 28.5% were from 45 to 64; and 22.4% were 65 years of age or older. The gender makeup of the city was 46.1% male and 53.9% female.

Of the city's population over the age of 25, 54.8% hold a bachelor's degree or higher.

91.8% spoke English, 1.9% Spanish, 1.4% Arabic, 1.2% Hungarian, 1.0% German, and 0.8% Greek.

2000 census
As of the 2000 United States Census, there were 20,735 people, 9,709 households, and 5,437 families residing in the city. The population density was 4,360.8 people per square mile (1,685.4/km). There were 10,166 housing units at an average density of 2,138.0 per square mile (826.3/km). The racial makeup of the city was 96.83% White, 0.41% African American, 0.07% Native American, 1.33% Asian, 0.02% Pacific Islander, 0.27% from other races, and 1.08% from two or more races. Hispanic or Latino of any race were 1.20% of the population.

There were 9,709 households, out of which 22.5% had children under the age of 18 living with them, 47.2% were married couples living together, 6.9% had a female householder with no husband present, and 44.0% were non-families. 40.3% of all households were made up of individuals, and 20.5% had someone living alone who was 65 years of age or older. The average household size was 2.11 and the average family size was 2.90.

In the city the population was spread out, with 20.9% under the age of 18, 4.3% from 18 to 24, 25.9% from 25 to 44, 24.6% from 45 to 64, and 24.2% who were 65 years of age or older. The median age was 44 years. For every 100 females, there were 82.0 males. For every 100 females age 18 and over, there were 77.4 males.

The median income for a household in the city was $71,636, and the median income for a family was $94,361. Males had a median income of $62,727 versus $32,145 for females. The per capita income for the city was $34,663. About 1.5% of families and 2.3% of the population were below the poverty line, including 1.3% of those under age 18 and 3.8% of those age 65 or over.

Government
The majority of Rocky River is part of Ohio's 16th congressional district, represented by Republican Representative Anthony Gonzalez; however a small portion, north of Detroit Road and the railroad track, along the coast of Lake Erie, is part of Ohio's 9th congressional district, represented by Democratic Representative Marcy Kaptur.

Notable people

(B) denotes that the person was born there.
 Kevin Barnes, front man and songwriter for the indie rock band of Montreal.(B)
 Nina Blackwood, the first of the original five MTV VJs, graduated from Rocky River High School in 1970.
 Clint Brown, pitcher for the Cleveland Indians and the Chicago White Sox, was a resident when he died in 1955.
 Carter Camper, ice hockey player who made his NHL debut with the Boston Bruins.
 Anthony Gonzalez, former NFL wide receiver, currently a U.S. congressman representing the Ohio 16th
 Chris Hovan, professional American football player for the St. Louis Rams(B)
 Sammy Kaye, Big Band Era bandleader and songwriter, graduated from Rocky River High School.
 Pat McCormick, comic actor and writer, grew up in Rocky River, and attended Rocky River High School.
 Norm Michael, college football player, born in Rocky River.(B)
 Martin Savidge, award-winning American television news correspondent for NBC News, was a resident when he graduated from Rocky River High School in 1976.
 Michael Stanley – Rock musician, graduated from Rocky River High School.
 George Steinbrenner, businessman and one-time owner of the New York Yankees.(B)
Brian K. Vaughan, comics and television writer.

References

External links

 
 Rocky River Chamber of Commerce

Cities in Ohio
Cities in Cuyahoga County, Ohio
Ohio populated places on Lake Erie
Populated places established in 1810
Cleveland metropolitan area
1810 establishments in Ohio